UMG Investments is an investment firm which was founded in 2006 by System Capital Management (SCM) to manage commodity assets. Since its creation, UMG Investments has expanded its range of activities and in 2016 changed its business model from a management to an investment company.

Shareholders and Management
100% of the company's authorized capital is owned by System Capital Management. The CEO is Andriy Horokhov.

Structure 
UMG Investments creates and develops businesses with high growth potential.[3] The company has portfolio companies in three areas:
 Mining – a group of companies VESCO and Novotroitsky Mine Administration
 By-products and waste management – Recycling Solutions
 Industrial goods and services – INTECH.

In 2019, the value of assets managed by UMG Investments company exceeded $ 500 million.

In March 2020, FEEDNOVA, a company that realizes the first in Ukraine high-protein feed additives and animal fats production plant, located in Busk city (Lviv region), has secured an investment from UMG Investments. The latter has acquired minority stake.

October 2020. The by-product and waste management portfolio presented by Recycling Solutions reports on the opening of a mineral fertilizers production complex in Kryvyi Rih. The main products are nitrogen and sulfur and complex fertilizers based on ammonium sulfate. Production capacity of the new facility allows to provide Ukrainian farmers with up to 100 thousand tons of finished products annually.

Portfolio Companies 
UMG Investments has portfolio companies in three areas:
 Mining (ball clay and limestone & dolomite)
 The by-product and waste management
 Industrial goods and services.

The mining portfolio is represented by the VESCO Group of companies  and the NTRU (Novotroitsky Mine Administration). 

VESCO Group of companies is producing over 3 mln tons of clay annually and exporting the product to more than 25 countries around the world. Total number of personnel is more than 1500.

The Novotroitsky Mine Administration is one of the largest producers of limestone in Ukraine with a production volume of 4 million tonnes per year. NTRU a reliable supplier of its own production to enterprises of the mining and metallurgical, lime, construction, glass, sugar, agricultural and road repair industries in Ukraine. Total number of personnel is more than 1100.

The by-product and waste management portfolio is represented by Recycling Solutions, which is a comprehensive secondary resource management operator for coal, coke-chemical, metallurgical and thermal power sectors of Ukraine.  Key secondary resources which company works with: coal combustion products, metallurgical slags, rare & technical gases, ammonium sulphate, industrial gases, animal by-products. 

The industrial goods and services portfolio is represented by INTECH, a company operating in production of industrial goods and services as well as railway & seaport logistics and offering commercial expertise of business projects in various industries.
The main activities: industrial explosions (bulk emulsion explosive production and blasting operations), products for metallurgy, railway & seaport logistics.

See also
 SCM

References

Ukrainian companies established in 2006
Economy of Donetsk Oblast
Economy of Kyiv
Mining companies of Ukraine
SCM Holdings